Sylvain Prudhomme (1979, La Seyne-sur-Mer) is a French writer.

He is the author of novels and reports, many of which are based in contemporary Africa, where he lived and worked. His novel Les Grands (ed. L'Arbalète, Gallimard) was designated "French Revelation of the year 2014" by the editorial staff of the magazine Lire.

In 2019 his novel Par les routes won the Prix Femina, one of the most important French literary prize.

Biography 
Sylvain Prudhomme spent his childhood in different African countries (Cameroon, Burundi, Niger, and Mauritius) before studying literature in Paris and then directing the Franco-Senegalese Alliance of Ziguinchor in Senegal from 2010 to 2012.

Works 
Novels
2007: Les matinées d'Hercule, Serpent à plumes
2010: L'affaire Furtif, Burozoïque, (with drawings by Lætitia Bianchi).
2010: Tanganyika Project, 
2012: Là, avait dit Bahi, L'Arbalète, Gallimard
- Prix Louis-Guilloux.
2014: Les Grands, L'Arbalète, Gallimard
- Prix Georges Brassens 2014.
- Prix Climax, Musique et Littérature 2014 (prize established by the bookstore Lucioles in Vienne (38) and C'rock radio.
-  2015 

2016: Légende, L’Arbalète, Gallimard
2018: L'Affaire Furtif, L’Arbalète, Gallimard
2019: Par les routes, L’Arbalète, Gallimard
-Prix Femina
-Prix Landerneau 
Novellas
2020: Les orages, L’Arbalète, Gallimard
Reports
2010: Africaine Queen. Dans les salons de coiffure de Château d'eau, éd. Le Tigre
2011: La vie dans les arbres, followed by Sur les bidonvilles, les cabanes et la construction sauvage, éd. Le Tigre

Translations
2009: John Reed, Pancho Villa, Allia
2011: Ngugi Wa Thiong'o, Décoloniser l'esprit,

References 

21st-century French male writers
21st-century French novelists
Prix Louis Guilloux winners
1979 births
People from La Seyne-sur-Mer
Living people
French male novelists
Prix Femina winners